Antonia Franceschi (born March 30, 1960) is an American actress, dancer, and choreographer.

Franceschi was one of the last generations selected by George Balanchine to join The New York City Ballet. She is a Time Out Award winner for Outstanding Achievement In Dance.

She is also known for her dance performances in the film musicals Fame and Grease. She subsequently danced under George Balanchine in New York, and now works as a choreographer and dance company director, dividing her time between the United Kingdom and the USA.

Early life 
Franceschi grew up in the American Midwest. Her parents divorced when she was eight years old, and she moved with her mother to New York City. She joined a gang for protection; she also studied ballet and began working in the theater by the age of eleven. She studied under Margaret Craske and attended the High School of Performing Arts in Manhattan.

Career

Early Career in the US. 
Franceschi was cast as a dancer in the 1978 film Grease. She was too young to work legally, but the film producers arranged for a falsified birth certificate. She was expelled from the High School of Performing Arts for her role in Grease, and she enrolled in the American Ballet Theatre School, funded by her earnings from the film.

She went on to play Hilary van Doren, a ballet student from a wealthy background, in the 1980 film Fame, set at the same High School of Performing Arts that Franceschi had attended in real life. Following this brief film career, she focused on more traditional ballet performance, working under George Balanchine at the New York City Ballet for eleven years. She has performed in about fifty of Balanchine's works.

She had works created for her by George Balanchine, Jerome Robbins, Lar Lubovitch, Peter Martins, Wayne McGregor, Mark Baldwin, Michael Clark, Arlene Phillips, Karole Armitage, Anthony Van Laast among others.

Expanding to the UK. 
She moved to London in 1995, where she has continued to work as a dancer and choreographer with Ballet Black and the Scottish Ballet, among other organizations.

In 2002, Franceschi developed Up From the Waste, a semi-autobiographical account of her difficult childhood, addressing gangs, drugs, harassment, rape, and murder. It shows her eventual escape through dance, but reflects earlier traumas in the dance world's demanding environment, including disordered eating, emotional abuse and sexual predation. In 2005, Ballet Black premiered Franceschi's piece Shift, Trip, Catch. She has described the theme of the work as "You can shift if you're in a relationship, and hopefully they’ll catch you." Reviewers noted the work for "[flexing] its emotional muscle, with a crackle of combative dance" and its "bold all-American punch." Her 2009 piece Kinderszenen is set to the musical work “Childhood Scenes” by composer Allen Shawn; reviewers noted its "lively moments" and "clever transitions, the fluid relationship between classical steps and the score." Also in 2009 was the launch of her multimedia work Pop8, which encompassed music, film, and dance to portray the rhythms of urban life on a small stage.

Antonia has choreographed for both British and American companies, and has her own Company 'AFD Just Dance' , which premiered in July 2015, performing at The Valletta Opera House, The Royal Winchester Theatre, London, and recently The MMA Center, NYC.

She is an Producer of The New York Ballet Stars (The Royal Festival Hall, The Queen Elizabeth Hall), and toured Harrogate and the Sintra Festival.

Antonia has choreographed for several European and American Companies most recently she had two NY premiers, She Holds Out Her Hand with The New York Theater Ballet collaborating with Claire Van Kampen and Say My Name, Barnard/Columbia Dancers with Composers Karen Le Frak and Allen Shawn.

Antonia also choreographed for theatre with Othello at The Globe Theater in London directed by Claire Van Kampen and was Movement Director for The Other Place at The Park Theatre.

In April 2019 Antonia presented Shift for The Emerging Choreographers Program at the 92stY, New York, and most recently created Liberandum for Joaquín De Luz for Theatre Real Madrid and Skirball in June 2019.

Antonia is an established dance teacher, she shares her love and knowledge of dance guest teaching for some of the world renowned companies and institutions; The Royal Ballet, Rambert, Richard Alston Dance Company, Wayne McGregor Dance (formerly Random), DV8 , The New York Theatre Ballet, Alvin Ailey, Juilliard, The Rambert Dance School,....

Works

As choreographer 

Up from the Waste, 2002
Shift, Trip, Catch, 2005
Kinderszenen, 2009
Pop8, 2009 [multimedia]
Othello, 2018 [theatre]
The Other Place, 2018 [theatre]
Liberandum, 2019

Filmography

Film

Television

References

External links 
 
 
 
 
 
 

1960 births
20th-century American dancers
American women choreographers
American choreographers
American female dancers
American ballerinas
American film actresses
American people of Italian descent
Living people
Fiorello H. LaGuardia High School alumni
20th-century American actresses
20th-century American women
21st-century American women